Helstrom is an American television series created by Paul Zbyszewski for the streaming service Hulu, based on the Marvel Comics characters Daimon and Satana Hellstrom. The series is produced by Marvel Television and ABC Signature Studios, with Zbyszewski serving as showrunner.

Tom Austen and Sydney Lemmon respectively star as Daimon and Ana Helstrom, the children of a powerful serial killer, who hunt the worst of humanity. Elizabeth Marvel, Robert Wisdom, June Carryl, Ariana Guerra, and Alain Uy also star. Helstrom was officially announced with a series order at Hulu in May 2019, planned as the first series in Marvel Television's Adventure into Fear franchise, which would exist within the Marvel Cinematic Universe (MCU) but would not cross over with the films or other television series of the franchise. However, upon its release, Zbyszewski stated that Helstrom was not part of the MCU. Filming took place in Vancouver from October 2019 until March 2020. Oversight of the series was moved to Marvel Studios in December 2019 when Marvel Television was folded into that company.

Helstrom was released on Hulu on October 16, 2020, and consists of 10 episodes. It was met with largely negative reviews, feeling the characters and plot were uninteresting, though the series' visual effects were considered impressive. Helstrom was canceled on December 14, 2020.

Premise 
Daimon and Ana Helstrom, the children of a serial killer, hunt the worst of humanity.

Cast and characters

Main 

 Tom Austen as Daimon Helstrom: An ethics professor who hopes to save those close to him from demons. Nolan Hupp portrays young Daimon.
 Sydney Lemmon as Ana Helstrom: Daimon's sister, who runs an auction house as a cover while hunting people who hurt others. Erica Tremblay portrays young Ana.
 Elizabeth Marvel as Victoria Helstrom / Mother / Lily / Kthara: Daimon and Ana's mother, who has been institutionalized for twenty years.
 Robert Wisdom as Henry / Caretaker: A guardian of the occult who fights demons.
 Ariana Guerra as Gabriella Rosetti: An agent of the Vatican who aids Daimon and Hastings.
 June Carryl as Louise Hastings: Head of the psychiatric hospital where Victoria is institutionalized.
 Alain Uy as Chris Yen: Ana's auction house business partner and surrogate brother.

Recurring 
 Daniel Cudmore as Keith Spivey / Basar: A nurse at the psychiatric hospital where Victoria is institutionalized.
 Deborah Van Valkenburgh as Esther Smith: The leader of the Blood and Caretaker's handler.
 David Meunier as Finn Miller: A member of the Blood.
 Trevor Roberts as Joshua Crow / Raum: A priest who is a victim of demon possession.
 Hamza Fouad as Derrick Jackson: A police officer and Yen's boyfriend.

Guests 
 Sandy Robson as Alex Tilden: A trucker possessed by Magoth.
 Shayn Walker as Ellis: One of Saint Teresa's security guards.
 Zachary S. Williams as Bryce: One of Magoth's vessels.
 Hiro Kanagawa as Sean Okamoto: A priest and acquaintance of Gabriella.
 Camille Sullivan as Zoe and Aubree Richards: Twins who were affected by Daimon and Ana's father.
 Fiona Dourif as Kthara: The demon that possesses Victoria.
 Tom Everett as Terrazi: The archbishop that Hastings answers to.
 Tarun Keram as Lee: Esther's main subordinate.
 Mitch Pileggi as Marduk Helstrom: A serial killer and the father of Daimon and Ana.

Episodes

Production

Development 
In May 2019, Hulu ordered Marvel's Helstrom to series, based on the Marvel Comics characters Daimon and Satana Hellstrom; their names are Daimon and Ana Helstrom in the series. Paul Zbyszewski, who previously served as an executive producer on Marvel's ABC series Agents of S.H.I.E.L.D., was set as showrunner and executive producer of Helstrom alongside Marvel Television head Jeph Loeb and Karim Zreik. Marvel Television and ABC Signature Studios were set to co-produce Helstrom. Zbyszewski said the series would be adding "scares" to the Marvel formula of "heart, humor, and action", and that he would use the Helstroms' story to "dissect some of our deepest fears", with Loeb saying the series is moving into a new, "chilling" corner of the Marvel Universe. The series consists of 10 episodes.

In December 2019, Marvel Television was folded into Marvel Studios, with some executives from Marvel Television moving over to Marvel Studios to oversee the completion of production on Helstrom, including Zreik. In April 2020, Marvel terminated Zbyszewski's overall deal with them, in part because of the COVID-19 pandemic, but Zbyszewski continued post-production work on the series. By July, the series was no longer officially titled Marvel's Helstrom, with Disney changing the title to simply Helstrom in order to distance the Marvel brand from the series' horror-based content, not wanting viewers to "stumble upon the show while looking for something in the tone" of the Marvel Cinematic Universe films. The Marvel logo is also not featured before each episode as was the case with Marvel Television's other series, with Zbyszewski saying this was "a way of telling the audience that this is something different" from the other Marvel series. On December 14, 2020, Hulu canceled the series, making it the final live-action Marvel series produced through Marvel Television, following its absorption back into Marvel Studios.

Casting 
Marvel announced the series' cast at the start of production in October 2019: Tom Austen and Sydney Lemmon star as Daimon and Ana Helstrom, with Elizabeth Marvel as their mother Victoria, Robert Wisdom as Caretaker, June Carryl as Dr. Louise Hastings, Ariana Guerra as Gabriella Rosetti, and Alain Uy as Chris Yen. Daniel Cudmore and David Meunier were cast in the recurring roles as Nurse Keith Spivey and Finn Miller, respectively in November.

Filming 
Production on the series began on October 7, 2019, in Vancouver, under the working title Omens. Filming wrapped on March 14, 2020.

Music 
Danny Bensi and Saunder Jurriaans were revealed to be the composers for the series in October 2020.

Relationship to the Marvel Cinematic Universe 
Hulu and Marvel announced both Helstrom and a Ghost Rider series in May 2019, referring to them as the cornerstone of the "Spirits of Vengeance" and intending on them being interconnected in a similar fashion to Marvel's Netflix television series. Marvel revealed that the two series would exist within the Marvel Cinematic Universe but would not cross over with the films or other television series of the franchise. In August, Loeb revealed that the fear-based series at Hulu were being collectively referred to as Adventure into Fear. Hulu was no longer moving forward with Ghost Rider by the end of September, but other Adventure into Fear series were still planned. Development on any further series was cancelled in December 2019 when Marvel Television was shut down.

Roxxon Corporation, a company from the Marvel Comics that has been featured throughout the MCU, is referenced in the series. Josh Bell of Comic Book Resources added that outside of the Roxxon inclusions, the series "bears essentially no connection to the Marvel Cinematic Universe" films or the other Marvel Television series. Regarding the series' place relative to the MCU, Zbyszewski explained Helstrom is "siloed off" in part because of it being a "darker-themed show", further adding that the series was "not tied to the MCU" and "our own separate thing". Zbyszewski called it "freeing" not being a part of the MCU or its canon, instead "hav[ing] just this little pocket of the universe". Zbyszewski also stated that Easter eggs in the series hinted at the cancelled Adventure into Fear franchise.

Marketing 
Zbyszewski and the series' cast took part in a panel for the series during the virtual convention Comic-Con@Home in July 2020, where the first teaser for the series was released. An official trailer was released on September 23. Ben Pearson of /Film said the series "looks a lot like something that would have aired on The CW circa 2006. Which, sadly, means it looks kinda terrible". Though he felt there were good actors in Helstrom, he added that the trailer made the series look "super cheap" and "bland". As well, he noted there were hardly any indications it was a Marvel series, and compared it to the film The New Mutants, both "holdover[s] from... different era[s]"–New Mutants with the acquisition of 21st Century Fox by Disney and Helstrom with Marvel Television being dissolved. Hulu released the first 10 minutes of the series at the New York Comic Con online panel held in October the same year.

Release 
Helstrom was released on Hulu on October 16, 2020, as part of Hulu's "Huluween" programming block, consisting of 10 episodes. Internationally, the series premiered on Disney+ under the dedicated streaming hub Star as an original series, on February 23, 2021.

Reception

Critical response 

For the series, review aggregator Rotten Tomatoes reported an approval rating of 27% based on 26 reviews, with an average rating of 5/10. The website's critics consensus reads, "Helstrom strong visual effects can't save it from the fact that its characters simply aren't interesting enough to overcome their familiar setting." Metacritic, which uses a weighted average, assigned a score of 40 out of 100 based on 9 critics, indicating "mixed or average reviews".

In his review, Bell from Comic Book Resources stated Helstrom "seems to have been completed largely out of contractual obligation" calling it "a generic, dull supernatural drama with a few names that may sound familiar to dedicated comics fans". Bell pointed out the pacing issues the series faced, comparing it to Marvel Television's other streaming series that also faced similar issues, and felt the series had a dull color palette. As well, Helstrom "doesn’t much resemble a superhero story, and aside from an occasional swear word and a bit of blood, it could be a mid-level CW supernatural drama about photogenic people going after standard-issue demons." He enjoyed Lemmon as Ana Helstrom, since she was "more charismatic than Daimon" and "the most prominent LGBTQ character in any Marvel TV series to date", but he was disappointed she would not become a fully realized version of her comic counterpart. Because the series was once meant to be part of the planned Adventure into Fear, Bell concluded Helstrom is "in an uninspired middle ground, and it seems likely to end up as nothing more than a footnote in the history of the MCU". Charles Pulliam-Moore at io9 said, "In another universe, the show’s focus on shadowy magics and ugly family drama might make it one of Marvel’s standouts, but here the series barely manages to make a strong argument in defense of its own existence." He added it was "telling" that Marvel's name was hardly featured in the series' marketing and the content of the series made it seem like this was by design". Sadie Gennis at TV Guide however found Helstrom the "perfect TV cocktail for right now ... with compelling mythology and morally complicated characters," recommending it as "a horror binge that goes down easy".

Accolades

References

External links 
 
 
 

2020 American television series debuts
2020 American television series endings
2020s American drama television series
2020s American horror television series
2020s American LGBT-related drama television series
2020s American supernatural television series
American action television series
American fantasy drama television series
American horror fiction television series
English-language television shows
Horror drama television series
Hulu original programming
Marvel Cinematic Universe television series
Television series about demons
Television series about dysfunctional families
Television series by ABC Signature Studios
Television series by Marvel Studios
Television series by Marvel Television
Television shows about murder
Television shows about spirit possession
Television shows based on Marvel Comics
Television shows filmed in Vancouver
Television shows set in Portland, Oregon
Television shows set in San Francisco